The Dallas Reunion Pro-Am was a golf tournament on the Champions Tour from 1985 to 1995. It was played at a number of locations in the greater Dallas, Texas area: Bent Tree Country Club (1985–1988), Stonebriar Country Club (1989–1993) in Frisco, Texas, and Oak Cliff Country Club (1994–1995).

The purse for the 1995 tournament was US$550,000, with $82,500 going to the winner. The tournament was founded in 1985 as the Senior Players Reunion Pro-Am.

Winners
Dallas Reunion Pro-Am
1995 Tom Wargo
1994 Larry Gilbert

Muratec Reunion Pro-Am
1993 Dave Stockton

Murata Reunion Pro-Am
1992 George Archer
1991 Chi-Chi Rodríguez
1990 Frank Beard

Murata Seniors Reunion
1989 Don Bies

Senior Players Reunion Pro-Am
1988 Orville Moody
1987 Chi-Chi Rodríguez
1986 Don January
1985 Peter Thomson

Source:

References

Former PGA Tour Champions events
Golf in Texas
Sports in Dallas
Pro–am golf tournaments
1985 establishments in Texas
1995 disestablishments in Texas